John Robert Brown (January 14, 1842 – August 4, 1927) was a United States representative from Virginia.

Biography
Born near Snow Creek, Franklin County, Virginia, he attended private schools in Franklin and Henry Counties and entered the Confederate Army in 1861 as a private in Company D, Twenty-fourth Regiment of Virginia Volunteers. In 1870 he formed a partnership with his father in the tobacco business at Shady Grove; he moved to Martinsville, Virginia in 1882 and continued in the tobacco business. He also engaged in banking and was mayor of Martinsville from 1884 to 1888.

Brown was elected as a Republican to the Fiftieth Congress, serving from March 4, 1887, to March 3, 1889, winning 57.06% of the vote, defeating Democrat George Craighead Cabell; he unsuccessfully contested the election of Claude A. Swanson to the Fifty-fifth Congress. He reengaged in the tobacco business and retired from active business pursuits; Brown died in Martinsville, with interment in Oakwood Cemetery.

References

 Retrieved on 2009-04-17

External links

1842 births
1927 deaths
Confederate States Army soldiers
Mayors of places in Virginia
People from Martinsville, Virginia
Republican Party members of the United States House of Representatives from Virginia
People from Franklin County, Virginia
19th-century American politicians
20th-century American politicians
Businesspeople from Virginia
Farmers from Virginia